Maxwell E. McCombs (born December 3, 1938) is an American journalism scholar known for his work on political communication. He is the Jesse H. Jones Centennial Chair in Communication Emeritus at the University of Texas at Austin. He is particularly known for developing the agenda setting theory of mass media with Donald Lewis Shaw. In a 1972 paper, McCombs and Shaw described the results of a study they conducted testing the hypothesis that the news media have a large influence on the issues that the American public considers important. They conducted the study while they were both working at the University of North Carolina at Chapel Hill. The resulting paper, "The Agenda-Setting Function of Mass Media", has since been described as "a classic and perhaps the most cited article in the field of mass communication research in the past 35 years." McCombs has been described as, along with Shaw, "one of the two founding fathers of empirical research on the agenda-setting function of the press."

Honors and awards
McCombs and Shaw were jointly awarded the 2011 Helen Dinerman Award of the World Association for Public Opinion Research. In 2014, McCombs received the Silver Medal from the University of Navarra in Spain, where he has been a visiting professor since 1994. With Shaw, he has also received the Murray Edelman Award from the American Political Science Association.

References

Further reading

1938 births
Living people
Journalism academics
People from Birmingham, Alabama
University of Texas at Austin faculty
Syracuse University faculty
University of North Carolina at Chapel Hill faculty
Tulane University alumni
Stanford University alumni